Ivano-Frankove, formerly Yaniv, is an urban-type settlement in Yavoriv Raion of Lviv Oblast in Ukraine. It is located on the right bank of the Vereshchytsia, a left tributary of the Dniester. The Vereshchytsia is dammed in the settlement, forming Yaniv Reservoir. Ivano-Frankove hosts the administration of Ivano-Frankove settlement hromada, one of the hromadas of Ukraine. Population:

Economy

Transportation
The settlement is on Highway M10, which connects Lviv with the Polish border. Across the border, it continues as the A4 highway to Rzeszów and Kraków.

The closest railway stations are Zatoka and Mshana, both on the railway connecting Lviv with Mostyska and crossing to Poland.

References

Urban-type settlements in Yavoriv Raion